Honey: Music from & Inspired by the Motion Picture is the soundtrack to the 2003 film, Honey. It was released on November 11, 2003 through Elektra Records and consisted of a blend of hip hop and R&B music. The soundtrack peaked at 105 on the Billboard 200, 47 on the Top R&B/Hip-Hop Albums and 6 on the Top Soundtracks.

Track listing
"Hurt Sumthin" – 3:32 (Missy Elliott)  
"I'm Good" – 3:35 (Blaque) 
"Gimme the Light" – 3:47 (Sean Paul) 
"React" – 3:39 (Erick Sermon featuring Redman) 
"Leave Her Alone" – 4:08 (Nate Dogg featuring Memphis Bleek, Freeway and Young Chris) 
"Ooh Wee" – 3:29 (Mark Ronson featuring Ghostface Killah, Nate Dogg, Trife and Saigon)
"It's a Party" – 3:23 (Tamia)  
"Thugman" – 3:44 (Tweet featuring Missy Elliott)
"Now Ride" – 2:51 (Fabolous) 
"J-A-D-A" – 3:44 (Jadakiss and Sheek) 
"Think of You" – 3:47 (Amerie) 
"Closer" – 3:50 (Goapele)
"I Believe" – 3:45 (Yolanda Adams)

Charts

Certifications

References

2000s film soundtrack albums
Hip hop soundtracks
2003 soundtrack albums
Albums produced by Missy Elliott
Albums produced by Warryn Campbell
Elektra Records soundtracks
Rhythm and blues soundtracks